A list of Bangladeshi films released in 1989.

Releases

References

See also

 1989 in Bangladesh

Film
Bangladesh
 1989